Rooky Ricardo's Records is a record store in the Lower Haight district of San Francisco, California, which features mainly soul music 45 rpm records. Dick Vivien, the sole proprietor and owner of Rooky Ricardo's, has been an inspiration to local musicians and disc jockeys in the San Francisco area for 25 years.

References

Companies based in San Francisco
Music retailers of the United States